David Scarfe (born 26 November 1960) is an Australian former cyclist. He competed in the team time trial event at the 1980 Summer Olympics.

References

External links
 

1960 births
Living people
Australian male cyclists
Olympic cyclists of Australia
Cyclists at the 1980 Summer Olympics
Place of birth missing (living people)